Hemigomphus gouldii is a species of dragonfly of the family Gomphidae, 
known as the southern vicetail. 
It is a small, black and yellow dragonfly, endemic to eastern Australia, where it inhabits permanent streams and rivers.

Gallery

See also
 List of Odonata species of Australia

References

Gomphidae
Odonata of Australia
Insects of Australia
Endemic fauna of Australia
Taxa named by Edmond de Sélys Longchamps
Insects described in 1854